Stenoloba viridicollar is a moth of the family Noctuidae. It is found in southwestern China (Sichuan)

The wingspan is about 22 mm.

Etymology
The name viridicollar refers to the greyish-green coloration of head and collar, which is the main external distinguishing character of the species.

References

Moths described in 2011
Bryophilinae